Çamlıdere (literally "pine creek") is a Turkish place name and may refer to:

 Çamlıdere, Ağlasun
 Çamlıdere, Ankara, a town and district of Ankara Province, Turkey
 Çamlıdere Şekerspor, a sports club from the district
 Çamlıdere, Bozdoğan, a village in Bozdoğan district of Aydın Province, Turkey
 Çamlıdere, Mersin, a village in Toroslar district of Mersin Province, Turkey
 Çamlıdere Dam, a dam in Turkey